Massimo Bergamin (born 21 May 1964 in Gavello) is an Italian politician.

He is a member of the right-wing populist party Lega Nord. Bergamin was elected Mayor of Rovigo and took office on 16 June 2015.

He resigned on 22 February 2019 after an internal government crisis.

See also
2015 Italian local elections
List of mayors of Rovigo

References

External links
 

Politicians of Veneto
Venetist politicians
1964 births
Living people
Mayors of Rovigo
Lega Nord politicians